= The Yorkshire Standard =

Online newspaper from West Yorkshire, England

- Type: Online news source
- Founded: 2014
- Language: English
- Official website: www.yorkshirestandard.co.uk

The Yorkshire Standard is an online newspaper that publishes community news specifically from West Yorkshire, England.

Areas it covers includes Bradford, Calderdale, Kirklees, Leeds and Wakefield. It also breaks news 24/7 on its website.

== Overview ==
The Yorkshire Standard publishes news and articles on business, motors, entertainment, lifestyle, health, and sports. It also claims to be updated daily, through news updates, or updates to its Community Noticeboard.

Publishing company Prolific North said that "The Yorkshire Standard joins the growing ranks of independent publications looking to move into local news at a time when the big media groups are reshaping to compete in the digital age."

== History ==
The Yorkshire Standard was launched on 17 February 2014, and founded by a University of Huddersfield graduate.

It recorded more than 2,500 unique visitors in its first days of operation. In its first week, the site also claimed to have over 4,800 unique visitors and over 8,000 pageviews.
